Elkin Alonso Serna Moreno is a Paralympic athlete from Colombia competing mainly in category T12 long-distance events.

He competed in the 2008 Summer Paralympics in Beijing, China.  There he won a silver medal in the men's Marathon - T12 event, did not finish in  the men's 5000 metres - T13 event and finished fourth in the men's 10000 metres - T12 event. He won again a silver medal in the 2012 London Paralympics, in the Marathon T12.

External links

 

1985 births
Living people
Sportspeople from Antioquia Department
Colombian blind people
Paralympic athletes of Colombia
Visually impaired category Paralympic competitors
Athletes (track and field) at the 2008 Summer Paralympics
Athletes (track and field) at the 2012 Summer Paralympics
Athletes (track and field) at the 2016 Summer Paralympics
Paralympic silver medalists for Colombia
Colombian male long-distance runners
Medalists at the 2008 Summer Paralympics
Medalists at the 2012 Summer Paralympics
Paralympic medalists in athletics (track and field)
Medalists at the 2007 Parapan American Games
Medalists at the 2011 Parapan American Games
Medalists at the 2015 Parapan American Games
21st-century Colombian people